Bonnie's Kitchen 1 is Bonnie Pink's first greatest hits album released under the Pony Canyon label on December 17, 1999.

Track listing
Heaven's Kitchen (from Heaven's Kitchen)
It's Gonna Rain! (from Heaven's Kitchen)
Do You Crash? (from Heaven's Kitchen)
 (Non-album song)
He (from Evil & Flowers)
 (Non-album song)
Your Butterfly (from Evil & Flowers)
 (from Evil & Flowers)
Lie Lie Lie (from Heaven's Kitchen)
Surprise! (Non-album song)
 (from Blue Jam)
 (from Blue Jam)
Maze of Love (from Blue Jam)
 (Previously Unreleased)
One Night with Chocolate (Non-album song)

Bonnie Pink albums
Pony Canyon albums
1999 compilation albums